Benjamin Bernard Hoffman (February 17, 1913 – December 15, 1979) was an American film, television and theatre actor. He was perhaps best known for playing "Earthquake McGoon" in Li'l Abner, both in the Broadway play and in the 1959 film.

Life and career 
Hoffman was born in Maryland, the son of Rose Hoffman. He had a brother and a sister. Hoffman attended Johns Hopkins University, where he studied medicine, and also attended Loyola College, where he studied explosives engineering. Hoffman left college to help out and support his family.

Hoffman began his career in 1937, when he appeared in two films, Meet the Missus and Forty Naughty Girls, playing the uncredited role of the "Orchestra Leader" in both films. Hoffman made his theatre debut in 1944, appearing in the Broadway play titled Catherine Was Great. He also played the role of "Joey Biltmore" in Guys and Dolls, during its first production. Hoffman later played the role of "Pawnee Bill" in the Broadway play Annie Get Your Gun.

Hoffman later moved to North Hollywood, California with his family. He played the role of "Earthquake McGoon" in the film version of the Broadway play Li'l Abner. Hoffman’s film and television credits include,  On The Town, Tombstone Territory, The Man Who Understood Women, Ironside, Death Valley Days, The Phil Silvers Show, Somebody Up There Likes Me, Rawhide, The Outfit and The Streets of San Francisco.

Death 
Hoffman died in December 1979 at the Sherman Oaks Hospital in Sherman Oaks, California, at the age of 66. He was buried in Mount Sinai Memorial Park Cemetery.

References

External links 

Rotten Tomatoes profile

1913 births
1979 deaths
People from Maryland
Male actors from Maryland
American male film actors
American male television actors
American male stage actors
20th-century American male actors
Explosives engineers
Johns Hopkins University alumni
Western (genre) television actors
Burials at Mount Sinai Memorial Park Cemetery